Francis Soto Band is a German-Swedish heavy metal band from Stuttgart, Germany.

History
Head of the band is Francis Soto, who was vocalist for Sabol's band Dark Horse in the early '90s. Soto was also the former frontman for the hard rock bands Picasso, Mystery, Silk & Steel, Sanvoisen, Subway, Turn Up and Wicked Sensation. Their debut single was a cover of the Corey Hart song "Sunglasses at Night", released in 2007 and in the same year their album Metalapolis 1 was released.

On 1 April 2008, Mathias Holm joined as guitarist, Andy Gaube left the band and the group was reformed as a German-Swedish project. In early 2010, the band released its album Lolas Themes, which followed the 2007's Metalapolis Part 1 and 2008's demo Dedicated.

Musical style
The band's music is in various styles of rock from traditional hard rock to modern rock, with influences from gothic and pop rock.

Members
Current line-up
Francis Soto (Vocals)
Eugen Leonhard (Guitar)
Markus Metzger (Keyboards and programming)
Frank Herold (Bass)
Bernd Heining (Drums)

Guest musicians
Jonas (The Godfather)
Hoernqvist (Guitar)
Thomas Larson (Guitar)
Lars Ratz (Bass)
Peter Oko (Guitar)
Andy Zeimn (Guitar and bass)
Bernd Heining (Drums)
Eric Rauti (Guitar)
Sina Nicklas (Vocals)
Vesa Nupponen (Guitar)
Tobias Benjamin Frank (Guitar)
Anke Sobek (Bass)
Theo Heidfeld (Drums)

Former members
 Mathias Holm (Guitar)
 Conny Payne (Bass)
 Lothar L.K. Knörle (Guitar, arrangement and idea of "Sunglasses at Night" cover version)
 Andy Gaube (Guitar)
 Andy Zeimn (Bass)
 Kersten Noczinski (Drums)

Discography

Albums
2006: The Journey
2007: Metalapolis Part 1
2010: Lolas Themes

Singles
2007: "Sunglasses at Night"

Demo
2008: Dedicated

References

External links
 Official Site
 Metalapolis
 Profil by Encyclopaedia Metallum: The Metal Archives
 Official MySpace

German heavy metal musical groups
Musical groups from Stuttgart
Musical groups established in 2006